Tripping Daisy is the fourth and final studio album by Tripping Daisy. It was released in 2000 on the independent label Sugar Fix Records.

Production
The album was released following the termination of the group's contract with Island Records. It came out a few months after the death of guitarist Wes Berggren, after which point the band broke up. The album is now out of print. Starting with the track "Drama Day Weekend", the majority of the songs on the record flow into each other, as though one long musical composition. According to Tim DeLaughter, there were only 500 CDs made. The final track ends at 4:37 & starts up again at 10:57 and plays out till the end (as studio gibberish & outtakes).

Track listing

Personnel 
Credits taken from Allmusic
Tim DeLaughter – vocals, guitar, keyboards
Mark Pirro – bass, backing vocals, percussion
Benjamin Curtis – drums
Philip Karnats – guitar, backing vocals, trumpet
Wes Berggren – lead guitar, keyboards

Production
Tim DeLaughter – artwork
Erik J. Courson - art direction
Rachel Gutek - art direction
Wyatt Parkins - art direction
Joshua Kessler - photography
Chris Penn - reissue producer

References

External links
 Magnet Magazine - Lost Classics: Tripping Daisy

2000 albums
Tripping Daisy albums